Rockenberg is a municipality in the Wetteraukreis, in Hesse, Germany. It is located approximately 36 kilometers north of Frankfurt am Main. Rockenberg is divided in the districts of Rockenberg and Oppershofen.

References

Wetteraukreis